Karen Jane Allen (born October 5, 1951) is an American film and stage actress. After making her film debut in Animal House (1978), she portrayed Marion Ravenwood opposite Harrison Ford in Raiders of the Lost Ark (1981), a role she reprised for Indiana Jones and the Kingdom of the Crystal Skull (2008). She also co-starred in Starman (1984) and Scrooged (1988). Her stage work has included performances on Broadway, and she has directed both stage and film productions.

Early life
Allen was born in Carrollton, Illinois, to Ruth Patricia ( Howell), a university professor, and Carroll Thompson Allen, an FBI agent. She is of English, Irish, Scottish, and Welsh descent. Her father's job forced the family to move often. "I grew up moving almost every year and so I was always the new kid in school and always, in a way, was deprived of ever really having any lasting friendships", Allen said in 1987. Although Allen says her father was very much involved in the family, she felt that she and her two sisters grew up in a very female-dominated household. After she graduated from DuVal High School, in Lanham, Maryland, at 17, she moved to New York City to study art and design at Fashion Institute of Technology for two years.

Allen later ran a boutique on the University of Maryland campus and spent time traveling through South and Central Asia. She attended George Washington University and began to study and perform with the experimental company, the Washington Theatre Laboratory, in Washington, DC. In 1974, Allen joined Shakespeare & Company in Massachusetts. Three years later, she moved back to New York City and studied at the Lee Strasberg Theater Institute.

Career
Allen made her major film debut in 1978 in National Lampoon's Animal House. Her next two film appearances were in The Wanderers, in 1979, and A Small Circle of Friends in 1980, where she played one of three radical college students during the 1960s. She also appeared (as a guest star) in the 1979 pilot episode of the long-running CBS series Knots Landing and played Annie Fairgate, the daughter of Don Murray's character Sid Fairgate and Sid's first wife Susan Philby.

Her career-changing role came with the blockbuster movie Raiders of the Lost Ark (1981), directed by Steven Spielberg, in which she played Marion Ravenwood,  the love interest of Indiana Jones (Harrison Ford). Allen won a Saturn Award for Best Actress for her performance. After a few minor films, including leading roles in the dramatic thriller Split Image (1982), directed by Ted Kotcheff, and the Paris-set romantic drama Until September (1984), directed by Richard Marquand, as well as other stage appearances, she co-starred with Jeff Bridges in the science-fiction film Starman (1984).

Allen debuted on Broadway in the 1982 production The Monday After The Miracle. In 1983, she played the lead in the off-Broadway play Extremities, a physically demanding role about a woman who turns the tables on a would-be rapist who attacks her. She often took breaks from movie roles to concentrate on stage acting; Allen appeared as Laura in the Paul Newman-directed film version of the Tennessee Williams play The Glass Menagerie, with John Malkovich and Joanne Woodward, in 1987.

In 1988, Allen returned to the big screen as Bill Murray's long-lost love, Claire, in the Christmas comedy Scrooged. In 1990, she portrayed the doomed crew member Christa McAuliffe in the television movie Challenger, based on the 1986 Space Shuttle Challenger disaster. Subsequently, she appeared in Spike Lee's Malcolm X (1992), in a small supporting role in The Perfect Storm (2000) and In the Bedroom (2001). She made guest appearances on Law & Order (1996) and Law & Order: Special Victims Unit (2001). She also starred in the short-lived series The Road Home (1994) and portrayed Dr. Clare Burton in the video game Ripper (1996). In 2014 she played the role of Betty Lowe in "Unfinished Business", the 13th episode of the 4th season of the CBS police procedural drama Blue Bloods.

Allen reprised her best-known role as Marion Ravenwood for the 2008 sequel Indiana Jones and the Kingdom of the Crystal Skull, in which she renews her relationship with Indiana Jones and reveals to him that they have a son named Henry Jones III, who named himself Mutt Williams, played by Shia LaBeouf.

Allen starred in the American premiere of Jon Fosse's A Summer Day at the Cherry Lane Theater in New York City, which opened in October 2012.

Allen has a long-standing relationship with the Berkshire Theater Group. It began in 1981, when she appeared in the play Two for the Seesaw at the Berkshire Theater Festival in Stockbridge, Massachusetts. She has also appeared in summer production of the nearby Williamstown Theater Festival. In August 2015, Allen directed Terrence McNally's Frankie and Johnny in the Clair de Lune for the Berkshire Theater Group. In 2016, Allen made her movie directing debut with the short film, A Tree. A Rock. A Cloud., based on the short story by Carson McCullers. It won the Best International Short at the Manchester Film Festival in March 2017. Allen played the lead role in 2017's Year by the Sea, a film based on The New York Times bestselling memoir by Joan Anderson.

Personal life
In 1988, Allen married actor Kale Browne and had a son, Nicholas, in 1990. The couple divorced in 1998.

Following the birth of her son, Allen accepted smaller roles in TV and films to concentrate on raising Nicholas. Nicholas went on to become a personal chef and win a Chopped competition on the Food Network, aired December 22, 2016.

She developed an affinity for knitting, and in 2003, started her own textile company, Karen Allen Fiber Arts, in Great Barrington, Massachusetts. The company has a store in Great Barrington that sells items Allen knits with a Japanese-made knitting machine as well as other products made by compatible designers. For her work in the textile arts, she was awarded an honorary master's degree from the Fashion Institute of Technology in 2009. Allen also teaches acting at Bard College at Simon's Rock, located in Great Barrington. , she lives in Massachusetts. She also works as a stage director.

Filmography

Awards and nominations

Notes

References

External links

 
 
 
 
 
 New York Times: A Night Out With | Karen Allen, Only for You, Dr. Jones
 Artist Direct Interview by Drew Tewksbury October 17, 2008
 

20th-century American actresses
21st-century American actresses
1951 births
Actresses from Illinois
American film actresses
American people of English descent
American people of Irish descent
American people of Scottish descent
American people of Welsh descent
American stage actresses
American video game actresses
Bard College at Simon's Rock faculty
Lee Strasberg Theatre and Film Institute alumni
Fashion Institute of Technology alumni
George Washington University alumni
Living people
People from Carrollton, Illinois
People from Berkshire County, Massachusetts